The Argentina women's national under-16 and under-17 basketball team is a national basketball team of Argentina, governed by the Argentine Basketball Federation.

It represents the country in international under-16 and under-17 (under age 16 and under age 17) women's basketball competitions.

Competitive record

World Cup

Under-17 World Cup
Argentina qualified for the 2018 FIBA Under-17 Women's Basketball World Cup where it finished 13th, better than any other team from South America.

Americas Under-16 Championship
The team qualified on six occasions. Argentina's best performance was 3rd place in 2009 and 2017.

In 2021, Angelina Giacone stood out as one of the more versatile players in the tournament averaging 7 points and 7.7 rebounds per game, but it was a team effort defensively and Delfina Cergneux led the charge on the boards to keep Argentina in every game.

South American U17 Championship
At the 2017 event in Bolivia, Argentina was the dominant team as they won all games by double-digits, including several blowouts.

See also
Argentina women's national basketball team
Argentina women's national under-19 basketball team
Argentina men's national under-17 basketball team

References

External links

Archived records of Argentina team participations

under
Women's national under-17 basketball teams